Relaunch (March 16, 1976 – November 5, 1996) was an American Thoroughbred racehorse and sire.

Background
Relaunch was a gray horse bred in Kentucky by Three Chimneys Farm & Taylor Made Farms. During his racing career he was owned by Glen Hill Farm and trained by John H. Adams.

Racing career
Relaunch won five of his eighteen starts, including the Del Mar Derby and the La Jolla Handicap in 1979.

Stud record
Relaunch is best remembered as a sire at Wimbledon Farm in Lexington, Kentucky.

Relaunch was the sire of:
 Launch a Pegasus (b. 1982) - won Grade I Widener Handicap
 Skywalker (b. 1982) - won Santa Anita Derby (1985), Breeders' Cup Classic (1986). Career earnings of US$2,226,750  
 Waquoit (b. 1983) - multiple Grade I winner who retired with earnings of US$2,225,360
 One Dreamer (b. 1988) - won 1994 Breeders' Cup Distaff
 Honour and Glory (b. 1993) - millionaire multiple stakes winner
 With Anticipation (b. 1995) - won United Nations Handicap (2001), Man o' War Handicap (2001, 2002), Sword Dancer Invitational Handicap (2001, 2002).  Career earnings: US$2,660,543

Relaunch was also the grandsire of Hall of Fame inductee Tiznow and damsire of Ghostzapper, the 2004 World's Top Ranked Horse, as well as the damsire of Real Shadai, the 1993 Leading sire in Japan.

Relaunch died on November 5, 1996, of colic.

Pedigree

References

1976 racehorse births
1996 racehorse deaths
Racehorses bred in Kentucky
Racehorses trained in the United States
Thoroughbred family 3-o
Godolphin Arabian sire line